is a rechargeable contactless smart card ticketing system for JR Central railway network which was introduced in the Chūkyō Area (Greater Nagoya) of Japan on November 25, 2006.

The name is an acronym for Tōkai IC Card. Just like JR East's Suica or JR West's ICOCA, the card uses RFID technology developed by Sony corporation known as FeliCa.

As of December 2007, 350,000 cards have been issued. In the Nagoya area, 50% of the riders, or 70% of the commuter pass holders, use the card.

Usable area
As of 2022, TOICA is currently accepted on JR Central lines in the following area:
Tōkaidō Main Line, between Atami and Maibara (the whole line of JR Central operation)
 Includes branch between Ōgaki and Mino-Akasaka
 East of Atami and west of Maibara, stations are served by Suica or ICOCA, see below on limitations when using
Gotemba Line, between Kōzu and Numazu (the whole line)
East of Kōzu, stations are served by Suica
Minobu Line, between Fuji and Nishi-Fujinomiya
Iida Line, between Toyohashi and Toyokawa
Taketoyo Line, between Ōbu and Taketoyo (the whole line)
Chūō Main Line, between Nagoya and Nakatsugawa
Kansai Main Line, between Nagoya and Kameyama (the whole line of JR Central operation)
West of Kameyama, stations are served by ICOCA
 Takayama Main Line, between Gifu and Mino-Ōta
 Taita Line, between Mino-Ōta and Tajimi (the whole line)
TOICA is also supported, since 2018, by Aichi Loop Line.

Integrated services
TOICA is also usable in Suica accepting area (Greater Tokyo Area, Sendai, and Niigata) and ICOCA accepting area (Osaka-Kobe-Kyoto and Okayama-Hiroshima) and SUGOCA accepting area (Fukuoka-Saga). Suica (including Mobile Suica), ICOCA and SUGOCA are usable in TOICA accepting area as well. However, a card has to be used within a single area, unless for some periodic cards which may support cross-area travelling within specific section; for instance, it is not possible to use a card for the trip between Tokyo and Nagoya. The integrated service with Suica and ICOCA started in March 2008 and with SUGOCA in March 2011.  Use in the PASMO, SUGOCA, or Kitaca service areas is valid since national integration of IC cards.

Smart card systems in Shizuoka Prefecture, namely LuLuCa (Shizuoka Railway) or NicePass (Enshu Railway) are yet to be integrated.

References

External links
  Official website by JR Central

Fare collection systems in Japan
Contactless smart cards
Rail transport in Nagoya
Rail transport in Aichi Prefecture
2006 introductions
2006 establishments in Japan